Prevention of Terrorism Act may refer to:

 Prevention of Terrorism Acts, passed between 1974 and 1989 to deal with terrorism in Northern Ireland in the United Kingdom
 Prevention of Terrorism Act, 2002, in India
 Prevention of Terrorism Act 2005, in the United Kingdom
 Prevention of Terrorism Act (Sri Lanka), in Sri Lanka, enacted as a temporary law in 1979, then made permanent in 1982
 Prevention of Terrorism Act 2015, in Malaysia